"Sunday Mornin'" is a song written by Margo Guryan. It was recorded as "Sunday Morning" and appeared on her 1968 album Take a Picture as well as on the B-side to her single "Spanky and Our Gang."

"Sunday Mornin'" was made famous by Spanky and Our Gang included on the album Like to Get to Know You, and Oliver. Spanky and Our Gang's version became a hit single, reaching No. 30 on the Billboard Hot 100, No. 39 on the easy listening chart in early 1968, and No. 23 in the Canadian RPM Magazine chart. Oliver's 1969 version was also released as a single, which reached No. 35 and No. 14 on the same charts, (plus No. 20 in Canada).

"Sunday Mornin'" was listed as one of the "102 most performed songs in the BMI repertoire during 1968".

Background
In the Spanky and the Our Gang version, the song also appears on an album in a long unedited version, including the group warming up their harmonies in the beginning (albeit for a different song), as well as an extended ending, where the sounds of a tape machine rolling back, plus the sounds of the group's joking until the fade is completed, causing one of the members to state that they need to get a new producer, resulting in laughter. This version lasted over six minutes in length.

Chart history
Spanky and Our Gang single

Oliver single

Other recordings
"Sunday Mornin'" was recorded by many others.  Other contemporary recordings include those by:
1968: Bobbie Gentry and Glen Campbell, on the album Bobbie Gentry and Glen Campbell
1968: Baja Marimba Band, on the album Do You Know the Way to San Jose?
1968: Marie Laforêt (as "Et Si Je T'Aime", with French lyrics by Michel Jourdan), on Album : 4. She also recorded "E se ti amo", a version with Italian lyrics by Daniele Pace. 
1969: Julie London, on Yummy, Yummy, Yummy.
1969: Richard "Groove" Holmes, on Welcome Home
1969: *A Hebrew version, was recorded by Shula Chen (as "Bo Habayta" (Come Home), with Hebrew lyrics by Avinoam Koren), on the album Yours, Shula Chen.
1969: Sue Raney, on With A Little Help From My Friends
2000: Linus of Hollywood, on Your Favorite Record
2001: Jim Galloway, on Music Is My Life

Popular culture
Shula Chen's version became synonymous with Tnuva cottage cheese after being used in a commercial for the product.

References

1968 singles
Spanky and Our Gang songs
Bobbie Gentry songs
Glen Campbell songs
Oliver (singer) songs
1967 songs
Mercury Records singles
Songs written by Margo Guryan